Luotian railway station is a railway station located in Luotian Town, Wanzhou District, Chongqing Municipality, People's Republic of China, on the Yichang–Wanzhou railway which is operated by China Railway Corporation.

Structure

Service

History
It's still under construction.

Nearby station

References

External links 

Railway stations in Chongqing